Friesia may refer to:

 Croton (plant), a genus of the flowering plant family Euphorbiaceae  (synonym by authority: Spreng.)
 Parodia, a genus of the cactus family Cactaceae (synonym by authority: Fric (nom. inval.))
Friesia (journal), a scientific journal concerned with mycology, see list of mycology journals
 Friesia (moth), a synonym of the moth genus Prosoparia of the family Erebidae

See also
 Frisia, a region along the Dutch-German-Danish coast
 Freesia, a genus of flowering plants
 Fresia (disambiguation)